Beru Karianako (born ) is an I-Kiribati male weightlifter, competing in the 85 kg category and representing Kiribati at international competitions. He participated at the 2010 Commonwealth Games in the 85 kg event.

Major competitions

References

1988 births
Living people
I-Kiribati male weightlifters
Weightlifters at the 2010 Commonwealth Games
Commonwealth Games competitors for Kiribati
Place of birth missing (living people)